Publius: The Journal of Federalism is a social science journal published by Oxford University Press for CSF: Publius, Inc., an affiliate of the Center for the Study of Federalism. The journal is international in scope and devoted to the theory and practice of federalism. It was founded in 1973 by Daniel Elazar. Its title is in honor of Alexander Hamilton, John Jay and James Madison, who used the pen-name "Publius" in 1787–1788 when they published the papers that became known as The Federalist. The journal is sponsored by the Federalism and Intergovernmental Relations Section of the American Political Science Association and receives financial support from Florida State University.

Abstracting and indexing 
It is covered by indexing and abstracting services including Social Sciences Citation Index, Historical Abstracts and PAIS. According to the Journal Citation Reports, the journal has a 2017 impact factor of 1.392, ranking it 72nd out of 196 journals in the category "Political Science".

See also 
 List of political science journals

References

External links

Oxford University Press academic journals
Political science journals